The Daniyal Akhmetov Cabinet was the 6th government in Kazakhstan that was led by Daniyal Akhmetov. President Nursultan Nazarbayev nominated Akhmetov at the joint session of the Parliament to be the Prime Minister on 13 June 2003, stating that the country needed a government to be led by a person with regional governing experience due to Akhmetov's role of being the Akim of Pavlodar Region, in order to speed up the pace of social and economic development. Akhmetov was approved by 73 of 77 members of the Mazhilis and 36 out of 39 members of the Senate of Kazakhstan.

Akhmetov continued leading the cabinet until his resignation on 8 January 2007 without a full explanation to which political analysts believed that it was due Nazarbayev's constant criticism of his administrative oversight of the economy. Following the 2007 Kazakh political shakeup, Akhmetov was appointed as the Minister of Defense by President Nazarbayev on 10 January and continued to work under Massimov's government until June 2009.

Composition

References 

Cabinets of Kazakhstan
2003 in Kazakhstan
Cabinets established in 2003
2003 establishments in Kazakhstan